Tikhon Bernstam (born 1979) is an American Internet entrepreneur who cofounded the companies Scribd and Parse.

Background 
Bernstam grew up in Palo Alto, California and then attended Dartmouth College, where he studied economics, computer science, and physics and graduated summa cum laude.
Bernstam attended the Y Combinator program in 2006, launching Scribd.
He went on to attend the Y Combinator program again in 2011, this time co-founding Parse, a platform to help mobile developers create mobile applications.

Bernstam is also an Angel investor and has invested in over 50 companies so far, including Optimizely, Scentbird and Crowdtilt.

In 2012, Business Insider named Bernstam one of the top 15 CEOs to watch.

Scribd.com 
In 2006, Tikhon Bernstam and partners Trip Adler and Jared Friedman started Scribd, the world's largest document sharing site and a top 250 most visited site on the internet. Sometimes called the "YouTube for Documents," Scribd allows you to upload, share, and embed documents of almost any format.
More than 80 million active users visit the world's largest digital library each month.

Over 150 publishers, including Random House, Wiley, Workman, Houghton Mifflin Harcourt, Pearson, Harvard University Press and Stanford University Press are now associated with Scribd.

Parse.com 
Parse is a cloud application platform powering tens of thousands of apps, including those for Cadillac, the Green Bay Packers, Home Depot, and the Food Network.

Fast Company named Parse one of the top 50 most innovative companies of 2013.

Parse was founded in 2011 by Tikhon Bernstam, Ilya Sukhar, James Yu, and Kevin Lacker, a small group of seasoned Googlers and Y Combinator alums who got together to build a useful set of back-end tools for mobile developers. Parse offers services that help mobile developers store data in the cloud, manage identity log-ins, handle push notifications and run custom code in the cloud.

Facebook acquired Parse for $85 million in 2013.

References

External links 
 Tikhon Bernstam's Homepage

1979 births
Angel investors
Businesspeople in information technology
Dartmouth College alumni
Living people
People from Palo Alto, California
Place of birth missing (living people)